Sepiapterin, also known as 2-amino-6-[(2S)-2-hydroxypropanoyl]-7,8-dihydro-1H-pteridin-4-one, is a member of the pteridine class of organic chemicals.

Sepiapterin can be metabolized into tetrahydrobiopterin via a salvage pathway. Tetrahydrobiopterin is an essential cofactor in humans for breakdown of phenylalanine and a catalyst of the metabolism of phenylalanine, tyrosine, and tryptophan to precursors of the neurotransmitters dopamine and serotonin.

Deficiency of tetrahydrobiopterin can cause toxic buildup of phenylalanine (phenylketonuria) as well as deficiencies of dopamine, norepinephrine, and epinephrine, leading to dystonia and other neurological illnesses.  This has led to clinical study of sepiapterin in humans to treat tetrahydrobiopterin deficiency.

Since atherosclerosis and other circulatory diseases associated with diabetes are also associated with tetrahydrobiopterin deficiency, animal studies of the value of sepiaterin in these vascular diseases have been done.  These studies show that relaxation of the blood vessels studied was impaired after animals were given sepiapterin, even though their levels of tetrahydrobiopterin were replenished.

See also
 Dihydrobiopterin
 Tetrahydrobiopterin
 Dystonia
 Phenylketonuria
 Salvage pathway

References

Pteridines
Secondary alcohols
Ketones
Lactams